Gary Charter Schools serve students who reside in Gary, Indiana, United States. Though operated by different corporations, all current charter schools in Gary are sponsored by Ball State University.

Uniforms
All students are required to wear school uniforms.

Schools

K-12
21st Century Charter School of Gary

5
Lead College Prep Charter School

K-8
Thea Bowman Leadership Academy

K-8
Charter School of the Dunes

K-5
Gary Lighthouse Charter School
West Gary Lighthouse Charter School

See also 
Gary Community School Corporation 
Lake Ridge Schools Corporation
List of schools in Gary

External links 
Charter Schools Association of Indiana

Education in Lake County, Indiana
Education in Gary, Indiana
Charter schools in Indiana